Shanti Kranti is a 1991 Telugu-language crime film produced and directed by V. Ravichandran under his Eshwari Productions banner. It stars Nagarjuna, V. Ravichandran, Juhi Chawla, Khushbu  and music composed by Hamsalekha. The film is a multilingual film simultaneously shot in Telugu, Kannada, and Tamil, in which Akkineni Nagarjuna was the lead in the Telugu version, Rajinikanth  in the Tamil version, while V. Ravichandran was in the  Kannada version, most of the scenes and artists are the same in all versions.

Plot
Shanti Kranti is the story of an honest police officer Subhash and his fight against a dreaded criminal named Daddy, who indulges in organ transplant mafia.

Cast

Nagarjuna as Inspector Subhash
V. Ravichandran as Inspector Bharath
Juhi Chawla as Jyothi
Khushbu as Rekha
Anant Nag as Daddy
Satyanarayana as Subhash's father 
Babu Antony 
Manik Irani 
Shankar Patel 
Charuhasan as Chief Minister 
Srinath as Commissioner Shiva Kumar 
P. J. Sarma as Home Minister 
Thyagaraju as I. G.
Sakshi Ranga Rao as Sastry 
Ahuti Prasad 
Siva Ram  
Annapurna as Subhash's mother 
Y. Vijaya as I.G's wife
Master Amith
Sangita as Child artist

Soundtrack

Music was composed by Hamsalekha. Music released on Lahari Music Company.

Awards
Ravichandran got a special technical award for this movie.

References

External links 
 

1991 films
1990s Telugu-language films
Films scored by Hamsalekha
Films directed by V. Ravichandran
Indian multilingual films
1991 multilingual films